Olivier Sylvestre (born 1982 in Laval, Quebec) is a Canadian writer from Quebec. He is most noted for his first theatrical play La beauté du monde, which won the Prix Gratien-Gélinas and was a shortlisted finalist for the Governor General's Award for French-language drama at the 2015 Governor General's Awards, and his short story collection Noms fictifs, which was a shortlisted finalist for the Governor General's Award for French-language fiction at the 2018 Governor General's Awards.

Sylvestre holds a bachelor's degree in criminology, and a diploma in playwriting from the National Theatre School of Canada. He was translated into English by Leanna Brodie. His monologue Le désert was premiered in January 2018 at Théâtre Prospero in a production by Le Dôme – creations théâtrales, a company Sylvestre co-leads. His play La loi de la gravité, Éditions Passages(s), has won numerous awards in Europe and was translated into English by Bobby Theodore. He has translated several plays by Canadian playwrights, Jesse Stong's You Can Do Whatever You Want and Waawaate Fobister's Agokwe.

His other plays have included Guide d’éducation sexuelle pour le nouveau millénaire.

His play La loi de la gravité was translated into German Das Gesetz der Schwerkraft by Sonja Finck (Gatineau) and performed at the Theaterfestival Primeur in Saarbrücken in 2016.

Works
 Nom fictifs. Roman. Hamac, Quebec 2017

References

External links
 The author at Hamac, editeur

Living people
21st-century Canadian short story writers
21st-century Canadian dramatists and playwrights
21st-century Canadian male writers
Canadian male short story writers
Canadian male dramatists and playwrights
Canadian short story writers in French
Canadian dramatists and playwrights in French
People from Laval, Quebec
Writers from Quebec
French Quebecers
Canadian male non-fiction writers
1982 births
21st-century Canadian translators